Allsvenskan 1995, part of the 1995 Swedish football season, was the 71st Allsvenskan season played. IFK Göteborg won the league ahead of runners-up Helsingborgs IF, while Hammarby IF and Västra Frölunda IF were relegated.

League table

Relegation play-offs

Results

Season statistics

Top scorers

References 

Print
 
 
 

Online
 
 

Allsvenskan seasons
Swed
Swed
1